Callianax biplicata, common names the "purple dwarf olive" "purple olive shell" or "purple olivella" is a species of small predatory sea snail, a marine gastropod mollusc in the family Olividae, the olives.

Distribution
Callianax biplicata snails are found in the Eastern Pacific Ocean coasts from British Columbia, Canada to Baja California, Mexico.

Habitat
This species is common on sandy substrates intertidally and subtidally, in bays and the outer coast.

Life habits

These snails are carnivorous or omnivorous sand-burrowers.

Shell description
This shell of this species is quite solid, and large for an Olivella, with adult shells ranging from 20 mm to 27 mm in length, about one inch. The shell is smooth, shiny, and is  an elongated oval in shape. The shell is often some shade of greyish purple, but it can also be whitish, tan, or dark brown. On the darker color forms there is often some rich yellow above the suture on the spire.

At the anterior end of the long narrow aperture there is a siphonal notch, from which the siphon of the living animal protrudes.

Human use
Native people of central and southern California used the shell of this species to make decorative beads for at least the last 9,000 years. Such beads have been discovered in archaeological contexts as far inland as Idaho and Arizona. Within the past 1,000 years these beads began to be manufactured in large quantities on southern California's Santa Barbara Channel Islands, indicating that they were used for shell money. The historic Chumash people called them anchum.

Notes

References
 Arnold, J.E. and A.P. Graesch. 2001. The Evolution of Specialized Shellworking Among the Island Chumash. In The Origins of a Pacific Coast Chiefdom: the Chumash of the Channel Islands, edited by J.E. Arnold, pp. 71–112. Salt Lake City: University of Utah Press.
 Bennyhoff, James A. and Richard E. Hughes. 1987. Shell Bead and Ornament Exchange Networks between California and the Western Great Basin. Anthropological Papers of the American Museum of Natural History 64:79-175.
 Fitzgerald, Richard T., Terry L. Jones, and Adele Schroth. 2005. Ancient Long Distance Trade in Western North America: New AMS Radiocarbon Dates from Southern California. Journal of Archaeological Science 32:423-434.
 McLean, J.H. (2007) Gastropoda. In Carlton, J.T. (Ed.) Light and Smith's Manual. Intertidal Invertebrates of the Central California Coast. University of California Press, Berkeley, pp. 713-753
 Powell II, C. L.; Vervaet, F.; Berschauer, D. (2020). A taxonomic review of California Holocene Callianax (Olivellidae:Gastropoda:Mollusca) based on shell characters. The Festivus. Supplement - special issue, 1-38.

External links
 Sowerby, G. B., I. (1825). A catalogue of the shells contained in the collection of the late Earl of Tankerville : arranged according to the Lamarckian conchological system: together with an appendix, containing descriptions of many new species London, vii + 92 + xxxiv pp
 Oldroyd, T.S. (1918). Olivella biplicata angelena, var. nov. The Nautilus. 32(1): 34- 35
 Vanatta, E.G. (1915). Notes on Oliva. The Nautilus. 29(6): 67-75

 

Olivellinae
Native American culture
Gastropods described in 1825
Taxa named by George Brettingham Sowerby I